SS Idaho was a 10,000-ton Texaco T2 type tanker ship, original named SS Dirigo built by the Texas Steamship Company of Bath, Maine, launched on 9 November 1918 and completed in February of 1919. In 1940 she was renamed the SS Idaho. Sub I-21, captain Matsumura, surfaced and used his deck guns to attack the SS Idaho 18 miles off the coast of the small town of Cambria, California, but the 10,000-ton Texaco tanker escaped with minimal damage. A few hour earlier on December 23, the submarine I-21 torpedoed the tanker SS Montebello, in the same spot off the coast of northern California, and then proceeded to machine-gun the survivors in the water. All of Montebello's 38 crew members survived the atrocity. After the war the Idaho was scrapped in 1947.

Battle of Los Angeles

These and other attacks put fear into California coastal cites, they turned off lights or blacked out windows at night. Some sandbagged their homes and businesses. Some radio stations went off the air and civil ships were ordered to stay in port. Commercial air travel was grounded. A military defense system was installed up and down the coast, that included blimps, patrol ships, artillery batteries, and aircraft.

See also
California during World War II
American Theater (1939–1945)
United States home front during World War II
Home front during World War II

References

 

Type T2-SE-A1 tankers
1918 ships
World War II tankers of the United States
Maritime incidents in December 1941